Arianne Sutner is an American film producer and animator, best known for producing the stop-motion animated film Kubo and the Two Strings.  She was nominated for an Academy Award for Best Animated Feature at both the 89th Academy Awards and the 92nd Academy Awards.

Filmography

As a producer
 Missing Link (producer) (2019)
 Kubo and the Two Strings (producer) (2016)
 ParaNorman (producer) (2012)
 The Life Aquatic with Steve Zissou (animation producer - uncredited) (2004)
 The Pigeon and the Onion Pie (Short) (producer) (2004)
 Phantom Investigators (TV Series) (line producer - 4 episodes) (2002)
 KaBlam! (TV Series) (line producer - 17 episodes)  (1998-2000)
 Life with Loopy Birthday Gala-Bration (TV Movie) (line producer) (1998)

Other Credits
 Lodgers (Short) (special thanks) (2016)
 The Big Day Off (Short) (assistant director) (1998)
 James and the Giant Peach (apprentice editor) / (editorial coordinator) (1996)
 Runaway Brain (Short) (assistant production manager: editorial) (1995)
 The Nightmare Before Christmas (story artist - uncredited) (1993)

Awards and nominations
 2019: Academy Award for Best Animated Feature - Missing Link (nom)
 2019: Golden Globe Award for Best Animated Feature Film - Missing Link (won)
 2019: Producers Guild of America Award for Best Animated Motion Picture - Missing Link (nom)
 2016: Academy Award for Best Animated Feature - Kubo and the Two Strings (nom)
 2016: BAFTA Award for Best Animated Film - Kubo and the Two Strings (won) 
 2016: Producers Guild of America Award for Best Animated Motion Picture - Kubo and the Two Strings (nom)
 2016: Visual Effects Society Award for Outstanding Animation in an Animated Feature Motion Picture - Kubo and the Two Strings (won)
 2012: GLAAD Media Award for Outstanding Film – Wide Release - ParaNorman  (nom)
 2012: Producers Guild of America Award for Best Animated Motion Picture - ParaNorman (nom)

References

External links

Living people
American animated film producers
American film producers
Year of birth missing (living people)
Laika (company) people